Rainy Creek is a creek in the Moira River and Lake Ontario drainage basins in Addington Highlands, Lennox and Addington County, Ontario, Canada.

Course
It flows south, then turns east for the rest of its run.

See also
List of rivers of Ontario

References

Rivers of Lennox and Addington County